Dowlatabad (also Romanized as Dowlatābād) is a village in Kushk-e Hezar Rural District, Beyza District, Sepidan County, Fars Province, Iran. At the 2006 census, its population was 238, in 56 families.

References 

Populated places in Beyza County